Roland Alexander (September 25, 1935 – June 14, 2006) was an American post-bop jazz musician.

Early life 
Born in Boston, Alexander grew up with his parents and sister, Gloria, in Cambridge, Massachusetts. He earned a bachelor's degree in music composition from the Boston Conservatory in 1958.

Career 
Alexander played tenor saxophone, soprano saxophone, and piano. He was a prolific composer and arranger who wrote and played for many of the better known bands in Boston during the 1950s, i.e. Sabby Lewis, Preston 'Sandy' Sandiford, Richie Lowery, Jaki Byard and many more. He co-led a group called the Boston All Stars that featured Trumpeter Joe Gordon, and after Joe Gordon left to play with Dizzy Gillespie's band Joe was replaced by a few of the more innovative trumpet soloists in the area, like Wajid Lateef (Crazy Wilbur Lucaw), and Gordon Wooly. He then moved to New York City in 1958. In addition to two solo releases, he played and recorded with John Coltrane, Howard McGhee, Max Roach, Sonny Rollins, Roy Haynes, Philly Joe Jones, Blue Mitchell, Sam Rivers, Archie Shepp, and Mal Waldron.

Discography

As leader
 1961: Pleasure Bent (Prestige) with Marcus Belgrave
 1978: Live at the Axis (Kharma) with Malachi Thompson and Kalaparusha Maurice McIntyre

As sideman
With Paul Chambers
 High Step (Blue Note, 1956 [1975)
With Eddie Gale
 Black Rhythm Happening (Blue Note, 1969)
With Abdullah Ibrahim
 African Space Program (Enja, 1973)
With Howard McGhee
 Dusty Blue (Bethlehem, 1960)
With Charlie Persip
 Charles Persip and the Jazz Statesmen (Bethlehem, 1960)
With Max Roach
 Drums Unlimited (Atlantic, 1965)
With James Spaulding
 Songs of Courage (Muse, 1991 [1993])

References

External links
[ Roland Alexander] at AllMusic

1935 births
2006 deaths
American jazz saxophonists
American male saxophonists
Jazz musicians from Massachusetts
Prestige Records artists
20th-century American saxophonists
20th-century American male musicians
American male jazz musicians